A list of notable flat horse races which take place annually in Hong Kong, under the authority of Hong Kong Jockey Club, including all conditions races which currently hold Group 1, 2 or 3 status.

Group 1

Group 2

Group 3

Other races

References

Horse racing in Hong Kong
Horse racing-related lists